is a railway station on  the Meitetsu Kakamigahara Line in the city of  Kakamigahara, Gifu Prefecture, Japan, operated by the private railway operator Meitetsu.

Lines

Station layout
Kakamigahara Shiyakusho-mae Station has two ground-level opposed side platforms. The station is unattended.

Platforms

Adjacent stations

History
It was renamed  on December 1, 1938,  on December 1, 1949,  on November 1, 1960,  on October 1, 1965, and Kakamigahara-Shiyakusho-mae Station on January 29, 2005.

Surrounding area
Kakamigahara City Hall
Gifu Air Field
Kakamigahara Aerospace Science Museum

See also
 List of Railway Stations in Japan

External links

  

Railway stations in Japan opened in 1926
Stations of Nagoya Railroad
Railway stations in Gifu Prefecture
Kakamigahara, Gifu